Zana (Zanë in Gheg or Zërë in Tosk, pl. zanë(t)/zërë(t), see other variants below) is an Albanian mythological figure usually associated with mountains, springs and streams, forests, vegetation and animals, and sometimes destiny. Zana is thought to have been originally a pre-Roman deity, and an Illyrian goddess equivalent of the Ancient Greek Artemis and Roman Diana.

Innumerable Albanian folk poems, myths and legends that are dedicated to Zana and her friends have been handed down to modern times. The zana are thought to have observed the speeches at the League of Prizren at 1878. Similar Albanian mythological figures with fairy-like attributes are: Ora, Bardha, Shtojzovalle, Mira and Fatí.

Name

Variants 
The name of the mythological figure is an old Albanian word. Therefore, several Albanian dialectal variants exist, such as zânë, zënë, zërë, xanë, xânë, etc. (and their definite forms: zâna, zëna, zëra, xana, xâna, etc.). Arbëreshë Zónja or Zónja të Jáshtëme are also used, the latter is found also in standard Albanian as Jashtësme, a euphemism of Zana, while zonjë is the common term for "lady".

Etymology 
Since the unvoiced Illyrian fricative th is analogous with z in Albanian, the Illyrian Thana (the name of a nymph, fairy or deity, attested in votive inscriptions of the Roman era) is traditionally considered the precursor of the Albanian Zana. The theonym is also regarded as a cognate and equivalent of the Latin Diāna. Other less secured etymologies have been proposed: from Albanian: zë/-ri, zâ/-ni, meaning 'voice' (pl. zëra/zana meaning 'voices'), with the sense of 'muse', also interpreted as a goddess of singing; from Albanian: zë(n), xë(n), zâ(n), meaning 'to take (hold of), seize, clutch, catch', as well as 'to learn';

Attributes
Zana is thought to have been a goddess in Illyrian times, the equivalent of the Ancient Greek Artemis and Roman Diana, and perhaps Thracian Bendis. As such she would have been the personification of the Moon and the lady of the forests, protector of animals, guardian of springs and streams, protector of women, as well as distributor of sovereignty. Many statues and other items associated to this goddess have been found in the Shkodra region in northern Albania, maybe more than of any other goddess of the Illyrian pantheon. There is also an exceptional frequency of ancient inscriptions of the Roman era dedicated to the cult of Diana in Albania and the rest of the Balkans, which gives reason to think of an interpretatio romana of an indigenous pre-Roman goddess. Innumerable Albanian folk poems, myths and legends that are dedicated to Zana and her friends have been handed down to modern times.

In Albanian folklore the original Zana is escorted by three wild goats with golden horns. In Northern Albania and Kosovo every mountain is said to have its own zana, who appeared as a fair maiden found bathing naked in mountain streams. The zana is believed to be extremely courageous, a formidable opponent, who can bestow her protection on warriors. In Albanian there is a notable expression, Ai ishte trim si zana, meaning, "He was as brave as a fairy", used to refer to very courageous individuals. The zana is believed to have the power to petrify humans with a glance.

The zana symbolize the vital energy of human beings. They idealize feminine energy, wild beauty, eternal youth and the joy of nature. The zana appear as warlike nymphs capable of offering simple mortals a part of their own psychophysical and divine power, giving humans strength comparable to that of the drangue. In the Albanian epic cycle Kângë Kreshnikësh, by breastfeeding the young Muji (one of the two heroic brothers and main characters of the songs) the zana empower him with superhuman strength.

Fate
In northern Albania, the zana are represented—similarly to the ora and to the southern Albanian fatí—as a group of three mythological goddesses who congregate in the night to decide the baby's destiny at birth and distribute their favors. Three types of Fates are believed to exist among the inhabitants of the Dukagjini highlands: e Bardha (the White One) distributes good luck and provides humans well, e Verdha (the Yellow One) distributes bad luck and castes evil spells, and e Zeza (the Black One) decides death.

Appearances in folklore
The zana appear in many folktales and in the Albanian oral tradition. A zana appears, for example, in the Albanian folktale The Lover's Grave. She appears to a young army captain, Bedri, who prostrates himself at her feet and must be reassured that she means him no harm. On the contrary, she warns Bedri to beware a wooden beam and a doe, and that he is not safe when he is "at the root". Bedri goes on to meet a beautiful woman, with whom he elopes, pursued by soldiers who know from his pronunciation of the word for "wooden beam" that he comes from an area with which they are at war. Bedri learns that his beloved's name is Dre, meaning doe, and the soldiers capture and kill the couple outside the town of Nderendje - the name of which means "at the root".
They are comparable with the Valkyries of the Nordic mythology, and other branches of Balkan and European  folklore like that of the Romanian zina and southern Slav Vila.

From Albanian literature by Robert Elsie:

Lahuta e Malcís, a classic work of Albanian folk tradition published in the 1920s, includes several appearances by zana. In one canto the zana of the Šar Mountains watches over local noblemen as they rally against the Treaty of San Stefano (which awarded areas hitherto under Albanian rule to Prince Nikola of Montenegro), and delights in their speeches and rhetoric. In another, the "great zana" issues a call to arms for all willing Albanian men to avenge the murder of the maiden Tringa by Slav bandits.

See also

 Albanian mythology
 Culture of Albania
 Xana
 Shtojzovalle
 Ora
 Fatia
 Bardha
 Nëna e Vatrës
 Drangue
 Zână

Sources

Notes

Citations

Bibliography

Albanian mythology
Fairies
Nature goddesses
Mountain goddesses
Water goddesses
Animal goddesses
Šar Mountains